The PWS-35 Ogar was a two-seat, aerobatic training biplane that was designed by Kazimierz Nowicki, Marian Piątka and Michał Rosnowski at the Lviv Polytechnic in 1935/1936.

Design and development
The aircraft was designed by three young scientists at the Lvov University of Technology ("Polytechnic") as their thesis. The designers initially planned to build a single aircraft (designated as the NPR-1, after the initials of the design team's members), but in 1937 the Podlaska Wytwórnia Samolotów became interested in their design and hired professional designers to modify it to fit the needs of the Polish Air Force. At the time the PAF was looking for an advanced trainer and it was decided that Ogar would be perfect for that role.

The prototype was completed in 1937 and in early 1938 underwent static tests. In the summer of 1938 it was successfully test-flown by S. Szubka. The first prototype, equipped with a de Havilland Gipsy Major engine, was heavier than anticipated and as a result the aircraft had poor stall characteristics and stability issues. By the end of the summer a second prototype, with an enlarged vertical stabilizer and a stronger PZInż. Major engine was completed and sent to the Institute of Aviation in Warsaw for further tests. Michał Rosnowski designed further modifications and the aircraft was scheduled to enter serial production in late 1938, however, numerous problems with handling and weight and balance postponed the start of serial production until late 1939. Out of the initial order of 150, 50 were finally ordered in the summer of 1939. Out of the first batch of 17 airframes started in July 1939, none were delivered to the Polish Air Force by the invasion of Poland. The first prototype was provided to the air force but was destroyed near Lubartów shortly afterwards. The other prototype was destroyed in an air raid on Warsaw's Okęcie Airport.

The aircraft was powered by a four-cylinder PZInż.

Variants
PWS-35/I
First prototype.
PWS-35/II
Second prototype.

Specifications (PWS-35/II)

References

1930s Polish sport aircraft
PWS aircraft
Aircraft first flown in 1938
Biplanes